Seye may refer to:

People

 Seye Adelekan (born 1988), Nigerian-British bassist, musician and singer-songwriter
 Seye Kehinde (born 1965), Nigerian journalist
 Seye Ogunlewe (born 1991), Nigerian track and field sprinter
 Abdoulaye Seye (1934–2011), Senegalese sprinter
 Mouhamadou Seye (born 1988), Slovak footballer
 Younousse Sèye (born 1940), Senegalese artist and actress

Other

 Seyé Municipality, municipality in the Mexican state of Yucatán